Rose Court is a bungalow court located at 449-457 S. Hudson Ave. in Pasadena, California. The court has a half-court arrangement with three buildings containing five residential units located alongside a driveway. Built from 1921 to 1922, the court was designed by the architectural firm Stewart, Young & Stewart in the Mission Revival style. The homes feature stucco walls, arched porches, and broken parapets along the roof and reflect a simplified interpretation of Mission Revival architecture.

The court was added to the National Register of Historic Places on July 11, 1983.

References

External links

Bungalow courts
Houses in Pasadena, California
Houses completed in 1921
Houses on the National Register of Historic Places in California
National Register of Historic Places in Pasadena, California
Mission Revival architecture in California